The Cromwell Cup was the second ever Sheffield
rules football competition (after the Youdan Cup) and was held in Sheffield, England. It was held in February 1868 and named after Oliver Cromwell, manager of the local Alexandra Theatre (not the Lord Protector or Sir Oliver Cromwell), who donated the cup. He also played for the Garrick club. The tournament was only open to teams under two years old. The final was held at Bramall Lane, Sheffield. The trophy is still held in the Sheffield Wednesday trophy cabinet.

Sheffield Rules at the time involved rouges as well as goals. Garrick were expected to sweep aside the newly created Wednesday team. Despite this the final remained 0(0)-0(0) at the end of the regulation 90 minutes. Both captains then agreed to carry on playing for a result with the scorer of the first goal taking the trophy. After another 10 minutes of play, Wednesday finally broke the deadlock with a goal, thus claiming their first trophy.

Participating teams

Results

See also
 The Youdan Cup

References

External links
Report on the tournament

Sport in Sheffield
Defunct football cup competitions in England
Defunct football competitions in South Yorkshire
1868 in English sport
1868 in association football
1867–68 in English football